Regine Velasquez is a Filipino singer and actress who has received several awards and nominations for her contributions in music, film and television. She rose to prominence after winning the television talent show Ang Bagong Kampeon in 1984 and the Asia Pacific Singing Contest in 1989. Velasquez signed a record deal with Viva Records and released her self-titled debut album in 1987. Later that year, she was named Most Promising Female Entertainer at the 10th Aliw Awards for her work. Her succeeding albums Nineteen 90 (1990) and Tagala Talaga (1991) won her the awards for the Most Popular Female Entertainer at the Box Office Entertainment Award ceremonies in 1991 and 1992.

Reason Enough (1993), Velasquez's fourth studio album, included the single "Sana Maulit Muli". She won Awit Awards for Best Performance by a Female Recording Artist for the song, and Best Performance by a Duet for "Muli" with Gary Valenciano. Velasquez's first international album, Listen Without Prejudice, was released in May 1994. Its lead single "In Love With You" was nominated for two Perfect 10 Music Awards, including Favorite Performance in a Song. She had full conceptual and creative control as the executive producer of her tenth studio album R2K, which was released in November 1999. In support of the album, she headlined the R2K Concert in April 2000 and won Best Female Major Concert Act at the Aliw Awards for the production. Velasquez was also named the Most Popular Female Entertainer at 30th Box Office Entertainment Awards, making her the first artist in the award show's history to receive the honor for the tenth consecutive year.

Velasquez released "You Are My Song", the main theme of her film Wanted Perfect Mother (1996). The song won Best Movie Theme Song and Best Ballad Recording at the Awit Awards in 1997. She also starred in the motion picture Kailangan Ko'y Ikaw (2000) and released the soundtrack's eponymous lead single, which won the FAMAS and Star Award for Best Movie Theme Song, as well as her second Awit Award for Best Performance by a Female Recording Artist in 2001. Velasquez's eleventh studio album Reigne was released in November 2001; two of its singles, "To Reach You" and "Sa Aking Pag-iisa", garnered her consecutive wins as Favorite Artist Philippines at the 2002 and 2003 MTV Asia Awards. Velasquez then appeared in the romantic comedies Pangako Ikaw Lang (2001) and Of All the Things (2013), for which she was awarded the Box Office Queen and the Golden Screen Award for Best Actress, respectively.

Velasquez has also received recognition for her work in television; she has accrued three Star Awards for Best Actress in 2002, Best Female Host in 2005 and Best Talent Search Program Host in 2006. In December 2016, she was included in People Asia magazine's annual People of the Year list.<ref name=" In addition to competitive awards, Velasquez has been honored with many lifetime achievement awards, including the Awit Awards' Dangal ng Musikang Pilipino, the Star Awards for Music's Pilita Corales Lifetime Achievement Award, FAMAS Awards' Golden Artist, and Myx Music's Magna Award.

Awards and nominations

Notes

References

External links

Lists of awards received by Filipino actor
Velasquez, Regine
Awards